The following is a list of notable deaths in October 2000.

Entries for each day are listed alphabetically by surname. A typical entry lists information in the following sequence:
 Name, age, country of citizenship at birth, subsequent country of citizenship (if applicable), reason for notability, cause of death (if known), and reference.

October 2000

1
Robert Allen, 73, American composer ("(There's No Place Like) Home for the Holidays", "Everybody Loves a Lover", "Chances Are").
Charlie Brewster, 83, American baseball player.
Rosie Douglas, 58, Prime Minister of Dominica and human rights activist.
Wiktor Eckhaus, 70, Polish–Dutch mathematician.
Aristeidis Kollias, 56, Greek lawyer, publicist, and folklorist, leukemia.
Reginald Kray, 66, British criminal., bladder cancer

2
Dung Hà, 34/35, Vietnam female gangster, homicide.
Amadou Karim Gaye, 86, Senegalese politician.
Richard Liberty, 68, American actor.
Justus Mühlenpfordt, 89, German nuclear physicist.
Elek Schwartz, 91, Romanian football player and coach.
Tom Troman, 86, English cricketer.

3
Peter Baker, 55, English cricketer.
Wojciech Has, 75, Polish film director, screenwriter and film producer.
Klondike Bill, 68, Canadian professional wrestler, neuromuscular disorder.
M. M. Mustapha, 76, Ceylonese lawyer and politician.
Benjamin Orr, 53, The Cars bassist and singer, pancreatic cancer.
John Worsley, 81, British artist and illustrator.

4
Rhadi Ben Abdesselam, Moroccan long-distance runner.
Tofig Guliyev, 82, Azerbaijani composer, pianist, and conductor.
Alfred Lammer, 90, Austrian-born World War II Royal Air Force pilot.
Tin Maung, 92, Burmese film actor, director and producer.
Chuck Oertel, 69, American baseball player.
Michael Smith, 68, English-born Canadian chemist, Nobel Prize laureate.
Yu Kuo-hwa, 86, Chinese politician, Premier (1984–1989),  complications from leukemia.

5
Leopold Barschandt, 75, Austrian footballer.
Johanna Döbereiner, 75, Brazilian agronomist.
Ruth Ellis, 101, African-American LGBT rights activist.
Cătălin Hîldan, 24, Romanian football player, cardiac arrest.
Bankson T. Holcomb Jr., 92, brigadier general in the US Marine Corps.
Stan Montgomery, 80, English footballer and cricketer.
Keith Roberts, 65, English science fiction author.
Cuco Sánchez, 79, Mexican singer, songwriter, guitarist, and actor, kidney failure.
Sidney R. Yates, 91, American politician (member of the United States House of Representatives from the state of Illinois).

6
William Bundy, 83, American attorney and intelligence expert (CIA).
José Cabanis, 78, French novelist, historian and magistrate.
John T. Connor, 85, American government official and businessman, leukemia.
Richard Farnsworth, 80, American actor and stuntman, suicide by gunshot.
George Huntston Williams, 86, American theologian.
Per-Olov Löwdin, 83, Swedish physicist.
K. Gunn McKay, 75, American politician, complications of mesothelioma.

7
Tony Adamle, 76, American professional football player, cancer.
Wilford S. Bailey, 79, American academic.
Ed Beisser, 81, American basketball player.
Leslie Kish, 90, Hungarian-American statistician.
Walter Krupinski, 79, German Luftwaffe fighter ace in World War II.
Vittorio Sardelli, 82, Italian footballer.

8
Hilde Eisler, 88, East German political activist and journalist.
Charlotte Lamb, 62, British novelist.
Clarence Myerscough, 69, British violinist.
Mihai Pop, 92, Romanian ethnologist.
Kaare Reitan, 97, Norwegian orthodontic researcher.
E. S. Johnny Walker, 89, American politician, leukemia.

9
Robert Frederick Bennett, 73, American lawyer and Governor of Kansas.
David Dukes, 55, American character actor, heart attack.
James V. Hartinger, 75, US Air Force general.
Charles Hartshorne, 103, American philosopher.
Patrick Anthony Porteous, 82, Scottish recipient of the Victoria Cross.
Joseph T. Ryan, 86, American prelate of the Roman Catholic Church.
Fred Williams, 71, American football player, stroke.

10
Sirimavo Bandaranaike, 84, Prime Minister of Sri Lanka.
Ferenc Farkas, 94, Hungarian composer.
Dick Klein, 80, American athlete and businessman.
Bruce Palmer Jr., 87, American army general.
Gene Palumbo, 54, American television producer and writer.
Bruce Vento, 60, American politician, lung cancer caused by asbestos.

11
Donald Dewar, 63, Scottish politician, cerebral haemorrhage.
Brian Foley, 80, British Roman Catholic priest and hymnist.
Hiroshi Inose, 73, Japanese electrical engineer, heart attack.
Matija Ljubek, 46, Croatian sprint canoeist, shot.
Rollee McGill, 68, American R&B singer and saxophonist.
Sam O'Steen, 76, American film editor and director.
Pietro Palazzini, 88, Italian Cardinal.
Thomas Leonard Wells, 70, Canadian politician, cancer.

12
Justo Arosemena Lacayo, 70, Colombian sculptor.
Melvin A. Cook, 89, American chemist.
William C. Fyffe, 71, American broadcast news reporter and news director
Mary K. Meany, 103, American politician and educator, pneumonia.
Gordon Stulberg, 76, Canadian-American film executive and lawyer, complications related to diabetes.

13
Benny Culp, 86, American baseball player and coach.
John Davis, 57, English cricketer.
Gus Hall, 90, labor leader and chairman of the Communist Party USA (CPUSA).
Jean Peters, 73, American actress.
Britt Woodman, 80, American jazz trombonist.

14
Adriana Benitez, 24, Colombian student leader, murdered by the United Self-Defense Forces of Colombia.
Art Coulter, 91, Canadian ice hockey player.
Dino Dibra, 25, Australian suspected murderer and victim, shot.
Jim Eaglestone, 77, English cricketer.
Tony Roper, 35, American stock car racing driver, racing accident.

15
George Gray Bell, 80, Canadian soldier.
Konrad Emil Bloch, 88, German-born biochemist, recipient of the Nobel Prize in Physiology or Medicine.
Vincent Canby, 76, American film and theatre critic (The New York Times).
Perry Webster Gilbert, 87, American marine biologist.
John Perceval, 77, Australian artist.
Rodolfo Sonego, 79, Italian screenwriter.

16
Mel Carnahan, 66, American lawyer and politician (51st Governor of Missouri).
Antonio Ferrandis, 79, Spanish actor.
Joaquín Gutiérrez, 82, Costa Rican writer, heart failure.
Rick Jason, 77, American actor.
Milan Kurepa, 67, Serbian physicist, complications following heart surgery.
Antonio Russo, 40, Italian journalist, murdered.
Joseph Scott, 78, American bobsledder.
Lu Xiaopeng, 80, Chinese aircraft designer, designed the Nanchang Q-5 and the Nanchang J-12.

17
Harry Cooper, 96, English-American PGA Tour golfer.
Donna Jogerst, 68, American baseball player (AAGPBL).
Joachim Nielsen, 36, Norwegian rock musician and poet, drug overdose.
Leo Nomellini, 76, Italian-American football player (San Francisco 49ers) and member of the Pro Football Hall of Fame, stroke.
Ivan Owen, 73, British voice actor, cancer.
John Douglas Swales, 64, English cardiologist and expert on hypertension.

18
Bruce Biggs, 79, New Zealand linguist.
Lebrecht Wilhelm Fifi Hesse, 65, Ghanaian public servant, cancer.
Julie London, 74, American singer and actress, cardiac arrest.
Sidney Salkow, 89, American screenwriter and film/television director.
Gwen Verdon, 75, American actress, heart attack.

19
Don Black, 72, Rhodesian tennis player, complications from bowel cancer surgery.
Mahir Domi, 85, Albanian linguist, professor, and academic.
Hortense Ellis, 59, Jamaican reggae musician.
Kay Fanning, 73, American journalist and publisher.
Shirley Gorelick, 76, American artist.
Kati Horna, 88, Hungarian-born Mexican photojournalist and photographer.
Antonio Maspes, 68, Italian sprinter cyclist.
Hans Moller, 95, German born American artist.
Charles Perkins, 64, Australian Aboriginal activist, and soccer player, renal failure.

20
Jenny Kastein, 87, Dutch breaststroke swimmer.
Kalfie Martin, 90, South African military commander.
Boris Seidenberg, 71, Soviet actor.

21
Frankie Crocker, 62, American disc jockey, pancreatic cancer.
Matti Kannas, 72, Finnish footballer.
Alan Rowe, 73, New Zealand-born British actor.
Dirk Jan Struik, 106, Dutch-American mathematician and historian of mathematics.
Barbara Tribe, 87, Australian-born artist.
Ralph A. Vaughn, 93, American academic, architect and film set designer.

22
Princess Xenia Andreevna of Russia, 81, Russian noblewoman.
Richard Harden, 83, Northern Irish politician.
Jean-Luc Mandaba, 57, Prime Minister of the Central African Republic, heart attack.
Fred Pratt Green, 97, British Methodist minister and hymn writer.
Hank Wyse, 82, American baseball player.

23
Benny Culp, 86, American baseball player.
Martin Rich, 95, German conductor.
Nils Täpp, 82, Swedish cross-country skier.
Yusuf Tunaoğlu, 54, Turkish footballer, cardiac arrest.
Yokozuna, 34, American professional wrestler, pulmonary edema.

24
Terry Haskins, 45, American Republican politician, melanoma.
Sitaram Kesri, 80, Indian politician and parliamentarian.
Fereydoon Moshiri, 74, Iranian poet.
Miriam Salpeter, 71, Latvian-American neuroscientist.
Little Mack Simmons, 67, American blues musician, colon cancer.

25
Klaus Bargsten, 88, German U-boat commander of the sunken  during World War II.
Mochitsura Hashimoto, 91, Japanese submarine commander during World War II.
Wood B. Kyle, 85, US Marine Corps Major General.
Jeanne Lee, 61, American jazz singer, poet and composer, cancer.
John Sinclair Morrison, 87, English classicist.
Robert E. Waldron, 80, American politician.

26
Muriel Evans, 90, American actress.
Laila Kinnunen, 60, Finnish singer.
Donald F. Lach, 83, American historian and author.
Jesús Puente, 69, Spanish actor.
Gardner Soule, 86, American writer.

27
Lída Baarová, 86, Czech-Austrian actress and mistress of the Nazi minister Joseph Goebbels.
Walter Berry, 71, Austrian bass-baritone.
Winston Grennan, 56, Jamaican drummer, cancer.
Eugene Lambert, 95, American sports coach.
Tim Ralfe, 62, Canadian television journalist, heart attack.
Bill Wainwright, 91, British communist activist.
Dwight Waldo, 87, American political scientist.
Bob Weighill, 80, English rugby player.

28
Andújar Cedeño, 31, Dominican baseball player, car accident.
Josef Felder, 100, German politician.
Carlos Guastavino, 88, Argentine composer.
Dorothy Hood, 81, American modernist painter.
Aare Laanemets, 46, Estonian actor, stroke.
Anthony Lee, 39, American actor and playwright, shot by police officer.
Jailani Naro, 71, Indonesian politician.
Howard Patterson, 73, American Olympic swimmer.
Irving Phillips, 95, American cartoonist, illustrator, playwright, and author.
Georges Poujouly, 60, French actor, cancer.
Robert Sommers, 89, Canadian politician.
Kemp Tolley, 92, U.S. Navy officer and author, stroke.

29
Charles F. Avila, 94, American electrical engineer.
Jacqueline Brumaire, 78, French operatic soprano.
Carlos Guastavino, 88, Argentine composer.
Rolf Hädrich, 69, German film director and screenwriter.

30
Steve Allen, 78, American comedian, composer, TV host (The Tonight Show, The Steve Allen Show) and author, traffic accident.
Elizabeth Bradley, 78, English actress (Maud Grimes in Coronation Street).
Howard Odell, 89, American football player and coach.

31
George Armstrong, 56, English football player and coach, brain haemorrhage.
Thomas Gifford, 63, American author, cholangiocarcinoma.
Ring Lardner Jr., 85, American journalist and screenwriter, cancer.
Samuel Pierce, 78, American politician.
Kaj Aage Gunnar Strand, 93, Danish astronomer.
Kazuki Watanabe, 19, Japanese musician, sedative overdose.

References 

2000-10
 10